"Teenage Life" was the  entry in the Eurovision Song Contest 2006, which was sung by Daz Sampson in English.

On 4 March 2006, Sampson had won the BBC show Making Your Mind Up with the song "Teenage Life", which was written and produced with John Matthews (a.k.a. Ricardo Autobahn) of the Cuban Boys, who were responsible for the Hampster Dance hit "Cognoscenti vs. Intelligentsia" in 1999. Released on 8 May 2006, the song entered the UK Singles Chart on 14 May 2006, reaching the top 10 the following week and peaking at number 8.

At Eurovision

The backing vocalists on "Teenage Life" were five young women, Emily Reed, Holly, Leeanne, Ashlee and Gabriella singing as well as dancing, depicted as school girls in a school-themed song and lyrics. She had been one of four finalists, singing "Help Me", finishing second to Jemini with the song "Cry Baby". Reed landed the fifth position as a replacement vocalist when it was decided one of the original qualifying amateur girls, Jessica, could not take part for various reasons, including her age.

In the BBC's 2013 documentary How to Win Eurovision, Sampson admitted: "Rap may not be the best of ideas and maybe Europe was not ready for Daz Sampson."

Track listing
"Teenage Life" (radio edit) (3:02)
"Teenage Life" (Uniting Nations remix) (6:48)
"Teenage Life" (JJ Mason remix) (5:40)
"Teenage Life" (Paul Keenan remix) (6:37)
"Teenage Life" (Rap-A-Long mix) (3:02)

Charts

Weekly charts

Year-end charts

References

External links
BBC News - Entertainment: Daz takes on Eurovision Mission, Michael Osborn, 16 May 2006
Lyrics at Diggiloo Thrush

Eurovision songs of the United Kingdom
Eurovision songs of 2006
2006 songs
Sony BMG singles
Songs about teenagers
Songs about school